Mascha Pijnenborg (born 30 June 1981) is a Dutch retired road racing cyclist.

Career
Pijnenborg began racing at an amateur level in 2006. In 2008 she was a guest rider with Red Sun Cycling Team at the Tour Cycliste Féminin International de l'Ardèche. Following this she joined the team for 2 years.

Outside of Cycling
Pijnenborg is also a counselor for people living with disabilities.

Major Results

2008
3rd Boezinge - Kampioenschap van Vlaanderen
2011
5th Overall Tour de Feminin-O cenu Českého Švýcarska
1st Stage 4
2012
7th Overall Tour de Free State
6th Road race, National Road Championships
6th Overall Tour de Feminin-O cenu Českého Švýcarska
9th Overall Internationale Thüringen Rundfahrt Der Frauen
2014
5th Overall Gracia–Orlová

References

External links

1981 births
Dutch female cyclists
Cyclists from North Brabant
People from Waalwijk
Living people
21st-century Dutch women